Flamenco is a variety of accompanied dance native to Spain.

Flamenco may also refer to:

Places
 Flamenco, Culebra, Puerto Rico, a barrio in Culebra, a municipality of Puerto Rico

Arts, entertainment, and media

Films
 Flamenco (1952 film), a 1952 Spanish documentary film
 Flamenco (1995 film), a 1995 Spanish documentary film

Music
 "Flamenco" (song), a song by Canadian rock band The Tragically Hip
 Flamenco guitar, a flamenco musical instrument and style
 New Flamenco, a derivative style of music and dance

Literature
 Flamenco (novel), a 1931 work by the British writer Eleanor Smith

Other uses
 Ocean Dream (1972 ship), a cruise ship known by Flamenco and New Flamenco
 Flamenco (apple), a British apple cultivar

See also
 Nouveau Flamenco (disambiguation)
 Flamengo (disambiguation)